Juan Pando Despierto (born in Madrid, 1943) is a Spanish historian.

Juan Pando was born within a family of military background. He is the son of the photographer Juan Pando Barrero. He received a triple formation, not only historical and military but a professional photographer. His thesis El mundo militar a través de la fotografía: España y el hecho internacional 1861-1921: Valores estéticos, sociológicos y políticos, enabled him to obtain his doctorate.

He is also an author in the field of photography. The Pando Files are preserved today at the Spanish Institute of Historical Inheritance.

References

Much of the content of this article comes from the equivalent Spanish-language Wikipedia article, accessed April 11, 2006.

1943 births
Living people
Writers from Madrid
20th-century Spanish historians
Spanish photographers